Squirt (1732 – ?) was a Thoroughbred racehorse, best known as the grandsire of Eclipse, founder of the breed's dominant sire line. He lived at a time when the Thoroughbred breed was in its infancy, before even the foundation of the Jockey Club (in 1750) and General Stud Book (in 1791). Thus information is incomplete.

Breeding
Squirt was bred by William Metcalfe of Beverley, Yorkshire. His sire was Bartlett's Childers, a full brother to Flying Childers, considered the greatest race horse of his time. Bartlett's Childers, also known as Bleeding Childers because he bled from the nose on exertion, never raced but did become a major sire. Squirt's dam, Sister to Old Country Wench, had earlier produced Grey Robinson, who in turn produced the undefeated Regulus.

Racing career
During his racing career, Squirt was owned by Charles Colyear, (2nd) Earl of Portmore. He began racing at five, as was customary at the time. His performances include:
 in 1737, won 200 guineas at Newmarket
 in 1738, beaten by Lath in a match race at Newmarket
 in 1739, won 200 guineas at Newmarket, 40 guineas at Epsom, 50 guineas at Stamford, and £30 at Winchester
 in 1740, won a plate at Salisbury.

Breeding career
Squirt then became a stallion for Sir Henry Harpur of Calke, Derbyshire. Squirt was nearly put down after developing laminitis, but his groom begged for a reprieve. Squirt's offspring includes:
 Marske (1750), sire of the unbeaten Eclipse, amongst others. Through Eclipse, Squirt's sire line continues to the present day. In Great Britain and Ireland, his sire line includes leading sires such as Sadler's Wells, Danehill and Galileo. In North America, leading sires in his line include Bold Ruler (sire of Secretariat), Mr. Prospector (ancestor of American Pharoah), Danzig, Storm Cat, AP Indy, Giant's Causeway and Tapit. In Japan, Squirt's sire line includes leading sires Sunday Silence, King Kamehameha and Deep Impact, while in Australia leading sires from his line include Redoute's Choice, Encosta De Lago and Fastnet Rock.
 Syphon (1750), winner of the £160 Great Subscription at York and others, sire of Sweetwilliam and Sweetbriar
 Tim (1752), whose daughters would go on to be significant producers
 Pratt's Old Mare, who went on to produce 17 foals, including Pumpkin, winner of 20 plates, and the mares Purity and Maiden, winner of 15 plates.

Pedigree

References

Squirt (horse) 

1732 racehorse births
Racehorses trained in the Kingdom of Great Britain
Racehorses bred in the Kingdom of Great Britain
Thoroughbred family 11